Mirny is a rural locality (a settlement) in Shadrukhinsky Selsoviet, Uglovsky District, Altai Krai, Russia. The population was 641 as of 2013. It was founded in 1954. There are 12 streets.

Geography 
Mirny is located 22 km northwest of Uglovskoye (the district's administrative centre) by road. Bor-Kosobulat is the nearest rural locality.

References 

Rural localities in Uglovsky District, Altai Krai